John Udall may refer to:

John Udall (Puritan) (1560?–1592), English clergyman
John Hunt Udall (1889–1959), mayor of Phoenix, Arizona from 1936 to 1938

See also
John Udal (judge) (1848–1925), English-born cricketer, antiquarian, author, lawyer and judge
John Udell (1795–1874), American farmer and Baptist lay preacher